was a Sōtō Zen master who was the 23rd abbot of Sojiji, abbot of Gotanjoji in Takefu, Fukui, and abbot of Daijoji in Kanazawa, Ishikawa all in Japan.

He was born in Tagajo, Miyagi in 1927. He graduated from the Naval Academy of Japan in 1945. He also graduated in religious studies at Tohoku University in 1953. He became a Sōtō Zen monk  according to Genshū Watanabe. He was trained in Sojiji and he studied under Giyen Inoue in Hamamatsu, Shizuoka.

He succeeded Ryūtan Matsumoto in Daijoji and became Tanto Roshi of Sojiji leading monks. He became Godo Roshi of Sojijisoin, abbot of Daijoji. He also devised chair Zazen.

He was elected vice abbot of Sojij, and became the 23rd abbot of Sojiji and Sotozen Superintendent Master (Kancho) in 1998.

He retired as abbot of Sojiji in 2002. He became abbot Sojijisoin. And he was revived Gotanjoji.

Works 
 Ryokan and Dogen (Kounsha, 1986)
 Breath of Life (Shunjusha, 2008)
 Thank you (Samgha, 2009)
 Breathing Buddha（Kadokawa, 2011）
 With a Soft Heart (Northern Press,2012)
 Living like a cat (Nigensha, 2013)
 "Atarimaedeii"（Rissho Koseikai Pub., 2015）

References

 I only know I'm satisfied （with Prof. Dr. Hideho ARITA, Kosei Pub. 2008）

Soto Zen Buddhists
Zen Buddhist abbots
Japanese Zen Buddhists
Tohoku University alumni
People from Miyagi Prefecture
1927 births
2020 deaths